Tyler Bjorn (born 13 March 1970 in Montreal, Quebec, Canada) is a Canadian former yacht racer who competed in the 2012 Summer Olympics, sailing as crew for helmsman Richard Clarke in the two-man Star keelboat class. In recent years, he has spent his time coaching sailing prospects.

References

1970 births
Living people
Sportspeople from Montreal
Canadian male sailors (sport)
Olympic sailors of Canada
Sailors at the 2012 Summer Olympics – Star